Kevin Sampson may refer to:
 Kevin Sampson (American football)
 Kevin Sampson (writer)
 Kevin Sampson (artist)